Prince Waldemar of Prussia may refer to:

 Prince Waldemar of Prussia (1817–1849), son of Prince Wilhelm of Prussia (1783–1851)
 Prince Waldemar of Prussia (1868–1879), son of Emperor Frederick III
 Prince Waldemar of Prussia (1889–1945), son of Prince Henry

See also
Prince Waldemar (disambiguation)